Gayani Dissanayake (born 20 April 1994) is a Sri Lankan netball player and a former captain of the Sri Lanka national netball team who plays in the position of goal defense or goal keeper in international netball tournaments. She is the second most capped player for Sri Lanka after veteran Tharjini Sivalingam.

Career 
Gayani made her international debut in 2011 after emerging from youth level. She became the vice captain of the national team in 2014 during the 2014 Asian Netball Championships. She continued as the vice captain of the side for the 2015 Netball World Cup, which was also her first World Cup appearance. Gayani was appointed as the captain of the team for a short tenure for the 2016 Asian Netball Championships where Sri Lanka emerged as runners-up to Malaysia.

She was also one of the key members of the Sri Lankan contingent which emerged as champions at the 2018 Asian Netball Championships beating Singapore 69–50 in the final, which also marked Sri Lanka's first Asian Netball Championships triumph since 2009. She was included in the Sri Lankan squad for the 2019 Netball World Cup, which was her second World Cup tournament.

References 

1994 births
Living people
Sri Lankan netball players
People from Kandy
2019 Netball World Cup players